Lunea may refer to:

Lunea, opera by Heinz Holliger
 Corail Lunéa rail service Intercités de Nuit
Lunea, proposed but not accepted as a new genus in the Guaireaceae ferns Osmundaceae